In mathematics, there are several integrals known as the Dirichlet integral, after the German mathematician Peter Gustav Lejeune Dirichlet, one of which is the improper integral of the sinc function over the positive real line:

 

This integral is not absolutely convergent, meaning  is not Lebesgue-integrable, and so the Dirichlet integral is undefined in the sense of Lebesgue integration. It is, however, defined in the sense of the improper Riemann integral or the generalized Riemann or Henstock–Kurzweil integral. This can be seen by using Dirichlet's test for improper integrals.  Although the sine integral, an antiderivative of the sinc function, is not an elementary function, the value of the integral (in the Riemann or Henstock sense) can be derived using various ways, including the Laplace transform, double integration, differentiating under the integral sign, contour integration, and the Dirichlet kernel.

Evaluation

Laplace transform 
Let  be a function defined whenever . Then its Laplace transform is given by

if the integral exists. 

A property of the Laplace transform useful for evaluating improper integrals is

provided  exists.

In what follows, one needs the result  , which is the Laplace transform of the function  (see the section 'Differentiating under the integral sign' for a derivation) as well as a version of Abel's theorem (a consequence of the final value theorem for the Laplace transform).

Therefore,

Double integration 

Evaluating the Dirichlet integral using the Laplace transform is equivalent to calculating the same double definite integral by changing the order of integration, namely,

Differentiation under the integral sign (Feynman's trick)
So let

In order to evaluate the Dirichlet integral, we need to determine . The continuity of  can be justified by applying the dominated convergence theorem after integration by parts.

Now, using Euler's formula  one can express the sine function in terms of complex exponentials:

Therefore,

Integrating with respect to  gives

where  is a constant of integration to be determined. Since   using the principal value. This means that for  

Complex integration 
The same result can be obtained by complex integration. Consider

As a function of the complex variable , it has a simple pole at the origin, which prevents the application of Jordan's lemma, whose other hypotheses are satisfied.

Define then a new function

One then takes the limit .

The complex integral is zero by the residue theorem, as there are no poles inside the integration path

The second term vanishes as  goes to infinity.

where  denotes the Cauchy principal value. Back to the above original calculation, one can write

By taking the imaginary part on both sides and noting that the function  is even, we get

Finally,

Alternatively, choose as the integration contour for  the union of upper half-plane semicircles of radii  and  together with two segments of the real line that connect them.

Dirichlet kernel 
Let

be the Dirichlet kernel.

It immediately follows that

Define

Clearly,  is continuous when , to see its continuity at 0 apply L'Hopital's Rule:

Hence,  fulfills the requirements of the Riemann-Lebesgue Lemma. This means

(The form of the Riemann-Lebesgue Lemma used here is proven in the article cited.)

We would like to say that

This is in fact justified if we can show the limit does exist, which we do now.

Using integration by parts, we have:

See the list of limits of trigonometric functions. We now show that  is absolutely integrable, which implies that the limit exists.

First, we seek to bound the integral near the origin. Using the Taylor-series expansion of the cosine about zero,

Therefore,

Splitting the integral into pieces, we have

for some constant .

See also 

 Dirichlet distribution
 Dirichlet principle
 Sinc function
Fresnel integral

References

External links 

 

Special functions
Integral calculus
Mathematical physics